Jacques Fesch (April 6, 1930, Saint-Germain-en-Laye – October 1, 1957, La Santé Prison, Paris) was the murderer of a French police officer, who became such a devout Roman Catholic while in prison awaiting execution that he has been proposed for beatification.

Early life
Fesch's father was a wealthy banker of Belgian origin, an artist and atheist, distant from his son. Jacques was a young aimless dreamer. Brought up a Roman Catholic, he abandoned religion by the age of 17, after his parents divorced. He was expelled from school for laziness and misconduct. At 21, he married his pregnant girlfriend Pierrette in a civil ceremony. He gave up a position at his father's bank, lived the life of a playboy, left his wife and their daughter, and fathered an illegitimate son with another woman. Disillusioned with his life, he dreamed of escaping to sail around the South Pacific Ocean, but his parents refused to pay for a boat.

Crime
On 24 February 1954, to fund the purchase of a boat, he went to rob Alexandre Silberstein, a money changer, of gold coins. Silberstein was struck but not unconscious, and raised the alarm. Fesch fled, losing his glasses, and shot wildly at Jean Vergne, a pursuing police officer, killing him. Minutes later he was arrested. Murdering a police officer was a heinous crime and public opinion, inflamed by newspaper reports, was strongly in favour of his execution. The Cour d'assises of Paris condemned him to death on 6 April 1957.

Religious conversion 
At first Fesch was indifferent to his plight and mocked his lawyer's Catholic faith whom he nicknamed : "the panther of God". However, after a year in prison, he experienced a profound religious conversion, became very pious, and bitterly regretted his crime. He corresponded regularly with his family, notably his brother and stepmother, and kept a spiritual journal. He accepted his punishment serenely and was reconciled to his wife the night before his execution. His last journal entry was "In five hours, I will see Jesus!".  An appeal for clemency to President René Coty failed, and he was guillotined.

Legacy
After his death his wife and daughter honoured his memory as an example of redemption. At first he was excoriated by the public, but with the work of Soeur Véronique, a Carmelite nun, and Father Augustin-Michel Lemonnier, the family effected publication of his writings, and from the 1970s these served as an inspiration to many.

On September 21, 1987 the Archbishop of Paris, Cardinal Jean-Marie Lustiger, opened a diocesan inquiry into his life; the cause for his beatification was formally opened in 1993. This has proved controversial, with those who feel his early crimes make him unfitting as a role model opposed to those who emphasize the hope of his final conversion.

His writings have often been quoted in Catholic publications. His personal journal and letters to his mother and brother are often about mystical or theological matters.

Theatrical plays about Fesch 
The story of Jacques Fesch remains relatively unknown in France. However, inspired by the true events of this "murderer turned Christian," the students of Ss Cyril and Method High School in Nitra, Slovakia, under the direction of Maria Marthe Galová, wrote and performed a theatrical play, "Spomeň si na mňa" (Remember Me), which is based on the life and conversion of Jacques.The play premiered on March 11, 2018, in the Andrej Bagar Theatre, Nitra.

References

Books about Fesch 
(In Spanish): El reflejo de lo oscuro. By Javier Sicilia, FCE, Mexico, 1997, 
 (In French) Gilbert Collard «Assasaint : Jacques Fesch, l'histoire du bon larron moderne » (Editions Presses de la Renaissance)

Bibliography 
Translation: Light over the Scaffold and Cell 18: The Prison Letters of Jacques Fesch. Alba House, 1996.
 
Translation: In five hours I will see Jesus (spiritual diary) of Jacques Fesch.

Association 
 Association "Les Amis de Jacques Fesch". Website in French : https://web.archive.org/web/20130113034221/http://amisdejacquesfesch.fr/

General references 

  republished on Catholic Education Resource Center
  by Fr. Oliviero Bruno, Catholic Chaplain in Poggioreale Jail in Naples

1930 births
1957 deaths
Executed writers
French diarists
French Christian mystics
French religious writers
French Roman Catholics
Executed French people
People executed for murder
Roman Catholic mystics
Roman Catholic writers
Venerated Catholics
People executed by France by decapitation
People from Saint-Germain-en-Laye
Executed people from Île-de-France
20th-century French writers
20th-century French male writers
20th-century Christian mystics
French Servants of God
French people of Belgian descent
French male non-fiction writers
20th-century diarists